Mohd Sany bin Hamzan is a Malaysian politician who has served as the Member of Parliament for Hulu Langat since December 2022, and Member of the Selangor State Legislative Assembly (MLA) for Taman Templer since May 2018. He is a member of the National Trust Party (AMANAH), a component party of the Pakatan Harapan (PH) coalition and was a member of the Malaysian Islamic Party (PAS), then component party of the Pakatan Rakyat (PR) coalition. He served as the 1st Youth Chief of AMANAH from 2016 to 2018 and Youth Elections Director of PAS.

Political career
Before joining Amanah, Sany was appointed Youth Elections Director of PAS Youth for 2013 - 2015.

In the 2022 Malaysian general election, Sany was elected the Member of Parliament for Hulu Langat, and was sworn in at the first sitting of the 15th Parliament on 19 December.

Election results

References

Living people
Malaysian people of Malay descent
Malaysian Muslims
Former Malaysian Islamic Party politicians
National Trust Party (Malaysia) politicians
1978 births
Members of the Selangor State Legislative Assembly